Lord Fairfax is a 65 lbs turtle found near a residential water source in Fairfax County, Virginia.

He is an alligator snapping turtle, a species not native to the region where he was found, and is the largest of his kind ever found in an urban environment. At maturity, Lord Fairfax is expected to exceed 200 lbs.

According to the Virginia Department of Game and Inland Fisheries,  Lord Fairfax was bred in captivity by citizens who did not realize how big he would get. Once they were no longer able to care for the giant animal, he was released to the wild.

His upbringing as a pet meant that he would not survive without proper care. The animal was relocated safely to the Virginia Zoo in Norfolk.

References 

Individual tortoises
Animal mascots